James Lemmo (born in New York City, New York) is an American photographer, cinematographer, film director, and screenwriter.

Biography
Prior to dedicating his professional life to photography, Lemmo also worked in film. His genres included thrillers, comedy, action, drama and crime.

Lemmo currently works in advertising photography, commercial photography, all product photography.

Filmography

References

External links
 
 

Living people
1949 births
American male screenwriters
American cinematographers
American photographers
People from New York City
Film directors from New York City
Screenwriters from New York (state)